William G. Tierney (born September 26, 1952) is an American lacrosse coach who currently heads the men's lacrosse team at the University of Denver. Tierney is the first college lacrosse coach to win an NCAA DI Championship west of the Eastern Time Zone. He has coached seven NCAA DI championship teams, including six at Princeton University and one at the University of Denver. Tierney's teams have had a combined winning percentage of .750.

Personal life

Player
Tierney played collegiate lacrosse at Cortland State where he was also a member of Delta Kappa Beta fraternity.  In 1973, he played on the USILA national championship team. This was the small college, non Division I national tournament, prior to the splitting of Division I, II and III national tournaments.

In 1972, Tierney was a member of a seminal Cortland NCAA Semifinal team that upset Navy. Following college, Tierney pursued a master's degree at Adelphi University, and coached high school lacrosse at Great Neck South High School, then Levittown Memorial High School.

Coach
In 1982, Tierney's took his first collegiate coaching position with the Rochester Institute of Technology.  He took the team to its first NCAA tournaments in both 1983 and 1984.  In 1983, he earned the Division III Coach of the Year. Following this success, Tierney joined the Johns Hopkins University Blue Jays as an assistant lacrosse coach (winning two national championships), and also served as head coach of the soccer team from 1985 to 1987.

In 1988, Tierney accepted the position as head coach of the Princeton Tigers.  He acquired a program that was underdeveloped, and quickly turned it around.  Tierney's Tigers won six NCAA championships (1992, 1994, 1996, 1997, 1998, and 2001) in nine years, and have appeared in eight NCAA championship games, nine NCAA Final Fours and 11 Ivy League championships. In 1992, Tierney was awarded USILA Coach of the Year honors.

Internationally, Tierney coached Team USA to a Gold Medal with a 15-14 OT win over Canada in the 1998 World Lacrosse Championships

In 2002, Tierney was inducted into the National Lacrosse Hall of Fame with the distinction of being "a truly great coach."

In 1998 and 2001, Tierney and his sons Trevor (a goaltender) and Brendan (midfield/attack), became the first father-sons combination to win an NCAA Men's Lacrosse Championship together. His daughter Brianne Tierney, a former player at Loyola of Maryland and Colgate, is currently the women's head coach at Kent State, which will begin varsity play in the 2019 season; her husband Dylan Sheridan is the assistant coach at Ohio State and was the men's head coach at Cleveland State.

Coach Tierney began coaching the men's lacrosse team at the University of Denver on July 1, 2009.  Coach Tierney called the change a "wonderful opportunity to start this new chapter in my life."

On May 25, 2015 Coach Tierney led Denver to the team's first National Championship. They beat Maryland by a score of 10-5. Denver was the 10th different school to raise the trophy and the first team west of the Appalachian Mountains.

Head coaching record

University of Denver

Princeton University

Rochester Institute

References

1952 births
Adelphi University alumni
American lacrosse players
Cortland Red Dragons men's lacrosse players
Denver Pioneers men's lacrosse coaches
Johns Hopkins Blue Jays men's lacrosse coaches
Living people
Princeton Tigers men's lacrosse coaches
High school lacrosse coaches in the United States